Shoalwater Bay Tribe is a Native American tribe in western Washington state in the United States. They are descendants of the Willapa Chinook, Lower Chehalis, and the Northern Athabaskan speaking Willapa (Kwalhioqua). The Shoalwater Bay tribe lives on the southwest coast of Washington in northwestern Pacific County, along the shores of Willapa Bay where the 2.693 km² (1.0397 sq mi) Shoalwater Bay Indian Reservation with 70 inhabitants (2000 census) is located. The reservation is just west of Tokeland, Washington.

The original language of the Shoalwater Bay Tribe, belonging to the Chinookan family of Native American languages, is extinct.

References

Shoalwater Bay Reservation and Off-Reservation Trust Land, Washington United States Census Bureau

External links
Shoalwater Bay Community Website
Shoalwater Bay Tribe website

American Indian reservations in Washington (state)
Native American governments in Washington (state)
Populated places in Pacific County, Washington
Populated coastal places in Washington (state)